CKML was a 50-watt radio station owned by Atomic Energy of Canada Limited through licensee "The Security Systems Coordinator, Chalk River Laboratories" which operated at 530 kHz on the AM band in Chalk River, Ontario, Canada. The station was designed solely to broadcast emergency information in event of an accident at the laboratory.

The station was approved by the Canadian Radio-television and Telecommunications Commission (CRTC) in 1998. CKML, was not considered as a continuous broadcasting station. The service was tested for one hour each month and, once a year, a two-hour emergency exercise was carried out. In a real emergency situation, the service could have been used for many hours.

The "ML" in the CKML callsign refers to Mark Ling of Chalk River Laboratories. 

According to the June 2020 issue of the Canadian Radio News Facebook page, CKML is off the air. There were no license renewals issued after the expiry date in 2012.

External links
 The Security Systems Coordinator, Chalk River Laboratories CKML Chalk River – Licence renewal - Broadcasting Decision CRTC 2005-323
 New radio service to provide emergency information Decision CRTC 98-509

Kml
Radio stations established in 1998
1998 establishments in Ontario
Emergency population warning systems in Canada
KML
KML